The 1974 FIBA Africa Championship for Women was the 4th FIBA Africa Championship for Women, played under the rules of FIBA, the world governing body for basketball, and the FIBA Africa thereof. The tournament was hosted by Tunisia from December 24 to 31, 1974.

Senegal defeated Tunisia 47–44 in the final to win their first title  and qualify for the 1975 FIBA Women's World Championship.

Draw

Preliminary round

Group A

Group B

Knockout stage

5–8th classification

Semifinals

7th place match

5th place match

Bronze medal match

Final

Final standings

Awards

External links
Official Website

References

1974 FIBA Africa Championship for Women
1974 FIBA Africa Championship for Women
AfroBasket Women
International basketball competitions hosted by Tunisia